The Dirección General de Aeronáutica Civil (DGAC; English: General Directorate of Civil Aeronautics) is an agency of the government of Bolivia. Its headquarters are on the ninth floor of the Edificio Multicine (Mutliplex Cinema Building) in La Paz. The agency investigates aviation accidents and incidents.

References

External links

 Dirección General de Aeronáutica Civil 

Bolivia
Government agencies of Bolivia
Aviation organisations based in Bolivia
Organizations investigating aviation accidents and incidents
Civil aviation in Bolivia